Alejandro Fernández (stylized in all caps) is the self-titled debut studio album by Mexican singer Alejandro Fernández. Produced by Pedro Ramírez. The hit singles from this album are: "Necesito Olvidarla", "Equivocadamente" and "Brumas" (for the latter Alejandro Fernández shot a music video). It was nominated for Regional Mexican Album of the Year at the 5th Lo Nuestro Awards.

Track listing
 "Todo Termino"  – 2:54
 "Equivocadamente"  – 2:49
 "Se Me Van Las Ganas"  – 3:30
 "Invierno"  – 4:05
 "Otra Vida"  – 2:53
 "Intenta Vivir Sin Mi"  – 2:54
 "Necesito Olvidarla"  – 2:59
 "Brumas"  – 3:20
 "Cuando Yo Queria Ser Grande"  – 3:43
 "En Cualquier Idioma"  – 2:31
 "Te Quedas O Te Vas"  – 2:39
 "Que Pregunta Muchacho" (Dúo con Vicente Fernández)  – 3:22

Chart performance

Album

Singles

References

1992 debut albums
Alejandro Fernández albums
Columbia Records albums